The Ministry of Water is the government ministry principally responsible for water supply, water resources, in Tanzania. The ministry's offices are located in Dodoma. The Minister of Water is Professor Makame Mnyaa Mbarawa.

Operations and organization

The work of the ministry is divided into the core function, relating to water, and the support function, relating to administrative work.

The core function includes the following divisions:

 Water Resources Division
 Water Supply and Sanitation Division
 Water Quality Services Division

References

External links
 

W
Tanzania
Water supply and sanitation in Tanzania
Tanzania